Fabasoft eGov-Suite is an application software product for document and records management for the public sector. For example, the software is used to implement eGovernment in the Federal Republic of Austria.

Development 
Fabasoft eGov Suite was developed by Fabasoft in Linz, Austria. The software seamlessly captures files, records and documents throughout their entire life cycle (Document Lifecycle Management, up to transactional online-service.

It is a general product specification which is supplemented by general or customer-specific requirements through partners in non-German speaking countries. Currently the product is used in Austria, Germany, Switzerland, Slovakia  Portugal, the UK and Russia.

Solutions 
 Document Management
 Collaboration
 Online service
 Archiving
 Corporate-wide search

Further reading 
 Gerald Martinetz, Markus Schett, Andreas Voglmayr: Fabasoft Project Competence. Fabasoft Press 2006. , 
 Karl Mayrhofer: The Fabasoft Project Model, Fabasoft Press 2006. , 
 Helmut Fallmann, Robert Hell, Christoph Jerschitz: The Fabasoft Reference Architecture in a Microsoft Windows Environment. Fabasoft Press 2006. ,

External links 
 Fabasoft eGov-Suite official website
 Fabasoft Group website

References 

Government software